Planica 1963 was international K.O.P. ski flying week competition, held from 22 to 24 March 1963 in Planica, SR Slovenia, SFR Yugoslavia. A total crowd of 65,000 spectators gathered over three days.

Schedule

Competitions

On 17 March 1963, technical inspection of hill was on schedule, and training for domestic (Yugoslavian) national team only with 40 jumps in total. Peter Eržen was the longest at 115 metres.

On 20 March 1963, first national teams arrived in early afternoon, joined by few others later that day. First unofficial training on Srednja Bloudkova K80 normal hill was on schedule, with distances not being measured as this was unofficial event. Only three countries were present at training Hungary, Soviet Union and East Germany. American director Warren Miller, well known for ski movies, announced his arrival to shoot in Planica, Bled and Elan (ski production process).

On 21 March 1963, there were total eleven national team who already arrived in Planica, waiting only for the last to come West Germany. Due to heavy snow hill had to be prepared. Free training with few rounds was on schedule, but distances were not measured.

On 22 March 1963, first day of K.O.P. (Kulm-Oberstdorf-Planica) international ski flying week was on schedule in front of 10,000 people. Torgeir Brandtzæg took lead after first day with 108 and 120 metres, which was also the longest jump of the day.

On 23 March 1963, second day of K.O.P. international ski flying week was on schedule in front of 15,000 people. Dieter Bokeloh won second day, but Jože Langus (trial jumper) set longest jump of the day at 120 metres.

On 24 March 1963, third and final day of K.O.P. international ski flying week was on schedule in front of record 40,000 people and president Josip Broz Tito. Very happy Dieter Bokeloh won three day international competition with total of 463.6 points.

K.O.P. International Ski Flying Week: Day 1 
22 March 1963 – Bloudkova velikanka K120 – Three rounds (2 best counting)

K.O.P. International Ski Flying Week: Day 2 
23 March 1963 – Bloudkova velikanka K120 – Three rounds (2 best counting)

K.O.P. International Ski Flying Week: Day 3 
24 March 1963 – Bloudkova velikanka K120 – Three rounds (2 best counting)

 Fall or touch!

Official results 

22-24 March 1963 – Bloudkova velikanka K120 – Four rounds

Team 
In memory of Stanko Bloudek (1890–1959).

Stanko Bloudek Memorial II

References

1963 in Yugoslav sport
1963 in ski jumping
1963 in Slovenia
Ski jumping competitions in Yugoslavia
International sports competitions hosted by Yugoslavia
Ski jumping competitions in Slovenia
International sports competitions hosted by Slovenia